Eoophyla simplicialis is a moth in the family Crambidae. It was described by Snellen in 1876. It is found on Java and in China.

Subspecies
Eoophyla simplicialis simplicialis (Java)
Eoophyla simplicialis rufalis (Caradja, 1938) (China)

References

Eoophyla
Moths described in 1876